Salios (foaled 23 January 2017) is a Japanese Thoroughbred racehorse. He was one of the leading juvenile colt in Japan in 2019 when he was undefeated in three races including the Saudi Arabia Royal Cup and the Asahi Hai Futurity Stakes. In the following year he won the Mainichi Okan as well as finishing second in both the Satsuki Sho and the Tokyo Yushun.

Background
Salios is a chestnut horse with a narrow white blaze bred in Japan by Northern Farm. He was sent into training with Noriyuki Hori and carries the colours of the Northern Farm associate Silk Racing. He is a large Thoroughbred, weighing over 530 kg.

He was from the tenth crop of foals sired by Heart's Cry a horse whose wins included the Arima Kinen and the Dubai Sheema Classic. His other foals have included Suave Richard, Admire Rakti, Just A Way and Lys Gracieux. Salios's dam Salomina was a German-bred mare who showed top-class form in her native country, winning the Preis der Diana in 2012 before being exported to Japan. Salomina's dam Saldentigerin won the Group 3 Baden-Württemberg-Trophy and was a female-line descendant of the German broodmare Suleika (foaled 1954), making her a relative of Slip Anchor, Buena Vista and Manhattan Cafe.

Racing career

2019: two-year-old season
Salios made his debut in an event for previously unraced juveniles over 1600 metres at Tokyo Racecourse on 2 June and won from Absolutismo and six others. After a break of four months the colt returned to the track and was stepped up in class to contest the Grade 3 Saudi Arabia Royal Cup at Tokyo on 5 October when he was ridden by Shu Ishibashi and started the 0.5/1 favourite against eight opponents. He raced in third place before moving up to dispute the lead in the straight and got the better of the filly Cravache d'Or to win by one and a quarter length in a race record time of 1:32.7 for 1600 metres.

On 15 December Salios was partnered by Ryan Moore when he started favourite for the Grade 1 Asahi Hai Futurity Stakes at Hanshin Racecourse. His fifteen opponents included Taisei Vision (winner of the Keio Hai Nisai Stakes), Red Bel Jour (Daily Hai Nisai Stakes), Bien Fait (Hakodate Nisai Stakes) and Meiner Grit (Kokura Nisai Stakes). After racing in third place behind Bien Fait and Meisho Titan he went to the front early in the straight and steadily increased his lead to win by two and a half lengths from Taisei Vision. His winning time of 1:33.0 was a new record for the race, beating the mark of 1:33.3 set by Danon Premium in 2017. Ryan Moore commented "He was a lovely horse... he was still very green on the turn so he should run even faster in the future. He's a big powerful colt and when I sat on him you get the impression that he's very strong already, but he should improve and be even better as he gets older being the size that he is and hopefully he’ll carry on".

In January 2020, at the JRA Awards for 2019, Salios finished runner-up in the poll for Best Two-Year-Old Colt, losing to Contrail by 77 votes to 197. In the official Japanese rankings however, Salios was rated the best two-year-old of 2019, one pound ahead of Contrail.

2020: three-year-old season
On his first run of 2020 Salios faced Contrail in a "much-anticipated showdown" for the Satsuki Sho over 1200 at Nakayama Racecourse and went off the 2.8/1 third choice in the betting. Ridden by the Australian jockey Damian Lane he raced up the inside before taking the lead in the straight but came of second best in a sustained struggle with Contrail, beaten half a length. Noriyuki Hori later said, "It was a difficult race last time, and he didn't change leads in the homestraight, as well as not getting the best ground, making things tough for him". Lane was again in the saddle when Salios was moved up in distance and started 3.4/1 second favourite behind Contrail for the Tokyo Yushun over 2400 metres at Tokyo. After being restrained in mid-division he was forced to race on the wide outside to obtain racing room and finished strongly but was never able to get on terms with Contrail and finished second, beaten three lengths by the winner.

After the summer break Salios returned to the track on 11 October when he was matched against older horses for the first time in the Grade 2 Mainichi Okan over 1800 metres at Tokyo. Ridden by Christophe Lemaire he started the odds-on favourite in an eleven-runner field which included Satono Impresa (Mainichi Hai), Daiwa Cagney (Epsom Cup), Contra Check (Turquoise Stakes) and Cadenas (Yayoi Sho). After racing in fourth place for most of the way, Salios took the lead in the straight and drew away to win by three lengths from Daiwa Cagney. In the Grade 1 Mile Championship over 1600 metres at Hanshin on 22 November was ridden by Mirco Demuro and went off the 3.1/1 second choice in a seventeen-runner field. He was restrained towards the rear before producing a strong late run but never looked likely to win and came home fifth behind Gran Alegria.

In the 2020 World's Best Racehorse Rankings, Salios was rated on 119, making him the equal 57th best racehorse in the world.

Pedigree

References

2017 racehorse births
Racehorses bred in Japan
Racehorses trained in Japan
Thoroughbred family 16-c